Annaghmore is a small village and townland (of 786 acres) near Loughgall in County Armagh, Northern Ireland. It is situated in the civil parish of Loughgall and the historic barony of Oneilland West. It had a population of 265 people (93 households) in the 2011 Census. (2001 Census: 255 people)

Places of interest

The Troubles

Education
 Annaghmore Primary School
 St. Patrick's Primary School
 Orchard County Primary School formed in 2005 after the merging of two local primary schools Annaghmore Primary School and Tullyroan Primary School

Former railway
Annaghmore railway station was opened by the Portadown, Dungannon and Omagh Junction Railway on 5 April 1858. It was closed by the Ulster Transport Authority on 15 February 1965.

Sports
Annaghmore has a GAA club, Annaghmore Pearses GFC (Cumann Phiarsaigh Eanach Mór), founded in 1915. The club currently plays in the county Junior football championship.

See also
List of towns and villages in Northern Ireland
List of townlands in County Armagh

References

Villages in County Armagh
Townlands of County Armagh
Civil parish of Loughgall